Sakire (literally "place of lime") is a village in northern Georgia. It is located on the right bank of the river Greater Liakhvi in the Java Municipality, Shida Kartli region. Distance to the municipal center Java is 3 km. The village is bordered by Oak forests.

References 

Mskhlebi Community villages